Kalanaur is a tehsil in Gurdaspur District of Punjab state in India. It is located 25 km towards west from District headquarters Gurdaspur. This historical town is situated on newly constructed National Highway 354. The town has historical significance as Mughal Emperor Akbar, was enthroned in a garden near the Kalanaur by Bairam Khan.

Demographics
As per the 2011 census of India, Kalanaur has a population of 13642. Males constitute 52% of the population and females 48%. Those under 6 years of age constitute 10.76% of the population. The average literacy rate is 83.97%, which is higher than the Punjab average of 75.84%. Male literacy is at 87.35%, and female literacy at 80.28%.

Geography
It has an average elevation of 243 metres (797 feet). The town is situated about 25 km to the west of Gurdaspur city, on the banks of the Kiran, a minor rivulet that merges into the Ravi river.

History
Prince "Nakshasena" established a separate independent kingdom at Indraprastha, which later rose to become a dominant force in its own right. ["Uttar Pradesh District Gazetteers" by Govt. Uttar Pradesh 1993, p25]
 
With the passage of time, the Bactrian and Scythian invasions of northern India, this Pandava branch established a kingdom at Kalanaur in what is now the modern-day district of Gurdaspur in Punjab (India) establishing the first capital of the Jarral Dynasty.
 
Jarral Rajputs are known as the descendants of the Pandavas and their branch was named after their apical ancestor, Raja Jir Rao, a Rajput descendant of the Pandavas of the Mahabharata. The "Jarrals" are therefore a "brother tribe" to the illustrious Janjua Rajputs of Punjab. ["Punjab Chiefs" by Sir Lepel H. Griffin (Lahore, 1909, p.97)]
 
Kalanaur was later captured in the twelfth century by the armies of the Ghorid Empire after a battle with the Jarral Rajas.
During the 14th-16th centuries, Kalanaur was a major urban centre and several historical events are associated with the town. Firuz Shah Tughluq (1352–88) built a beautiful palace on the banks of the Kiran rivulet. During the reign of Sayyid Mubarak Shah (1421–35), Kalanaur was ruled by the Khokhar rajput tribe under the leadership of raja Jasrath Khokhar. In February 1556, Mughal Emperor Akbar, was enthroned in a garden near the Kalanaur by Bairam Khan. The masonry platform, where he was crowned can be visited even today. There is a mosque that was built during his reign.

During period of anarchy in latter half of the 18th century, the Kanhaiya Misl, a militia under Sardar Haqeeqat Singh Kanhaiya, occupied Kalanaur. His son Jaimal Singh extended his territory up to Fatehgarh Churian and shifted his residence there. Jaimal Singh's daughter Chand Kaur was married to Kharak Singh, eldest son and heir of Ranjit Singh, in 1812. Later, when the area was annexed by Ranjit Singh, he granted it to Kharak Singh. It was later granted in fief to one Raja Dina Nath, and was finally annexed into British India after the death of Divan Dina Nath in 1857.

Culture
Kalanaur was at one time a centre of art, trade and cottage industry. A local saying has it that "a person who has not seen Lahore should see Kalanaur."

The town votes when they come to pay obeisance to the lord. The Gurudwara Banda Bahadur, built on the site of a well excavated by order of Banda Bahadur, is another landmark of the town. There is also a temple of Shiva and a mosque built during the reign of Mughal Emperor Akbar.

References

External links
History

Cities and towns in Gurdaspur district